Jason Saggo (born November 23, 1985) is a Canadian mixed martial artist who previously fought in the lightweight division of the Ultimate Fighting Championship (UFC).

Background
Saggo graduated from University of Guelph.

Mixed martial arts career
Saggo made his professional debut in August 2009, winning a fight in Northern Ireland. He amassed a record of 9-1, competing primarily for various regional promotions in Canada before signing with the Ultimate Fighting Championship in the spring of 2014.

Ultimate Fighting Championship
Saggo made his promotional debut against Josh Shockley on June 14, 2014 at UFC 174. Saggo defeated Shockley via first round TKO.

Saggo faced promotional newcomer Paul Felder on October 4, 2014 at UFC Fight Night 54. Saggo lost the fight by split decision.

Saggo was expected to face Marcin Bandel on April 11, 2015 at UFC Fight Night 64. However, Saggo pulled out of the bout due to an injury to his achilles tendon and was replaced by promotional newcomer Stevie Ray.

Saggo faced Justin Salas on March 5, 2016 at UFC 196. He won the fight via TKO in the first round.

Saggo next faced Leandro Silva on June 18, 2016 at UFC Fight Night 89. He won the fight via split decision.

Saggo faced Rustam Khabilov on December 10, 2016 at UFC 206. He lost the one-sided fight via unanimous decision.

Saggo faced  Gilbert Burns on September 16, 2017 at UFC Fight Night 116. He lost the fight via knockout in the second round. He was subsequently released from the UFC.

BTC Fight Promotions
Following his release from the UFC, Saggo signed a multi-fight deal with BTC Fight Promotions out of Burlington, Ontario. He had his first fight on November 24, 2018 against Adam Assenza at BTC 4 for the BTC Lightweight Championship and won via first round rear-naked choke. 

On May 9, Saggo vacated the lightweight title in preparation for a catchweight bout against Deivison Ribeiro on June 1, 2019 at BTC 6.

Mixed martial arts record

|-
|Win
|align=center|13–4
|Adam Assenza
|Submission (read-naked choke)
|BTC 4: Vendetta
|
|align=center|1
|align=center|4:53
|Peterborough, Ontario, Canada
|
|-
|Loss
|align=center|12–4
|Gilbert Burns
|KO (punch)
|UFC Fight Night: Rockhold vs. Branch 
|
|align=center|2
|align=center|4:55
|Pittsburgh, Pennsylvania, United States
|
|-
|Loss
|align=center|12–3
|Rustam Khabilov
|Decision (unanimous)
|UFC 206
|
|align=center|3
|align=center|5:00
|Toronto, Ontario, Canada
|
|-
|Win
|align=center|12–2
|Leandro Silva
|Decision (split)
|UFC Fight Night: MacDonald vs. Thompson
|
|align=center|3
|align=center|5:00
|Ottawa, Ontario, Canada
|
|-
|Win
|align=center|11–2
|Justin Salas
|TKO (punches)
|UFC 196
|
|align=center|1
|align=center|4:31
|Las Vegas, Nevada, United States
|
|-
|Loss
|align=center|10–2
|Paul Felder
|Decision (split)
|UFC Fight Night: MacDonald vs. Saffiedine
|
|align=center|3
|align=center|5:00
|Halifax, Nova Scotia, Canada
|
|-
|Win
|align=center| 10–1
|Josh Shockley
|TKO (punches)
|UFC 174
|
|align=center|1
|align=center|4:57
|Vancouver, British Columbia, Canada
|
|-
|Win
|align=center| 9–1
|Stephen Beaumont
|Submission (rear-naked choke)
|AFC 19
|
|align=center|1
|align=center|3:46
|Edmonton, Alberta, Canada
|
|-
| Win
|align=center| 8–1
|Iraj Hadin
|Submission (rear-naked choke)
|SFS 7
|
|align=center|2
|align=center|3:41
|Hamilton, Ontario, Canada
|
|-
| Win
|align=center| 7–1
| Eric Attard
|Submission (rear-naked choke)
|SFS 5
|
|align=center| 1
|align=center| 3:24
|Hamilton, Ontario, Canada
|
|-
| Win
|align=center| 6–1
|Keven Morin
| TKO (punches)
|Ringside MMA 12
|
|align=center|3
|align=center|3:49
|Montreal, Quebec, Canada
|
|-
| Loss
|align=center| 5–1
|Jesse Ronson
| Decision (split)
|Global Warriors FC 1
|
|align=center|3
|align=center|5:00
|Hamilton, Ontario, Canada
|
|-
| Win
|align=center| 5–0
|Derek Boyle
| Submission (rear-naked choke)
|JEG - MMA Live 1
|
|align=center|3
|align=center|2:18
|London, Ontario, Canada
|
|-
| Win
|align=center| 4–0
|Taylor Soloman
| Submission (armbar)
|Knockout Entertainment MMA: The Reckoning
|
|align=center|2
|align=center|3:25
|Orillia, Ontario, Canada
|
|-
| Win
|align=center| 3–0
|Kyle Vivian
| Submission (triangle choke)
|Ringside MMA 9
|
|align=center|1
|align=center|2:03
|Montreal, Quebec, Canada
|
|-
| Win
|align=center| 2–0
|David Lafond
| Submission (triangle choke)
|Ringside MMA 8
|
|align=center|2
|align=center|2:38
|Beauport, Quebec, Canada
|
|-
| Win
|align=center| 1–0
|Dominic McConnell
| Submission (rear-naked choke)
|UC 4
|
|align=center|1
|align=center|0:00
|Newry, Northern Ireland
|
|-

References

External links
 
 

Living people
1985 births
Sportspeople from Toronto
Canadian male mixed martial artists
Lightweight mixed martial artists
Mixed martial artists utilizing Brazilian jiu-jitsu
Brazilian practitioners of Brazilian jiu-jitsu
People awarded a black belt in Brazilian jiu-jitsu
Ultimate Fighting Championship male fighters
University of Guelph alumni